Savannakhet (ສະຫວັນນະເຂດ), officially named Kaysone Phomvihane since 2005 and previously known as Khanthaboury (ຄັນທະບູລີ), is a city in western Laos. It is the capital of Savannakhet Province. With a population of 125,760 (2018), it is the second-largest city in Laos, after Vientiane. Although the old French colonial quarter of the town, along the Mekong River-front, is depressed and crumbling, the town's proximity to Thailand's booming economy has brought about new commercial development in the northern part of the town, near both the river crossing and the bus terminal.

Like all Lao cities, Savannakhet has a mixed population of Lao, Thai, Vietnamese and Chinese, as well as minority peoples from the Lao interior. It has a large 15th-century Buddhist temple, Wat Sainyaphum, a Chinese temple, the Catholic Co-Cathedral of St. Therese and a mosque. The Second Thai–Lao Friendship Bridge over the Mekong connects to Mukdahan Province in Thailand. The two-lane,  bridge opened to the general public on 9 January 2007.

The annual per capita income of Kaysone Phomvihane City is US$2,041 (2018).

Name change
The settlement of Savannakhet was formerly called Khanthaboury. Then it became Savannakhet. Its name was changed to Kaysone Phomvihane in 2005, while retaining its status as the provincial capital of Savannakhet Province. The city is the birthplace of Kaysone Phomvihane, the first leader of Laos from 1975 to 1992 after the dissolution of the Kingdom of Laos. In 2018, its status was upgraded to that of a "city". In order to attain city status, a district or municipality must be financially self-sufficient and have a population of at least 60,000 persons.

Transport
The city is served by Savannakhet Airport.

Climate
Savannakhet features a tropical savanna climate (Aw) according to Köppen climate classification with a little subtropical climate characteristics as the city located 16.5° north of the equator. The diurnal temperature variation seems to be greater during winter due to dry conditions. The city experiences dry season during winter months and wet season during summer months due to activation of monsoon. The driest month is December with precipitation total , while the wettest month is August with precipitation total .

<div style="width:75%">
{{Weather box
|location = Savannakhet, Laos (1981-2010)
|metric first = yes
|single line = yes
|Jan record high C = 37.2
|Feb record high C = 39.2
|Mar record high C = 39.6
|Apr record high C = 41.1
|May record high C = 41.2
|Jun record high C = 38.0
|Jul record high C = 38.5
|Aug record high C = 36.1
|Sep record high C = 38.0
|Oct record high C = 35.0
|Nov record high C = 37.2
|Dec record high C = 38.0
|year record high C = 41.2

|Jan high C = 29.2
|Feb high C = 32.0
|Mar high C = 34.6
|Apr high C = 35.2
|May high C = 33.3
|Jun high C = 32.8
|Jul high C = 31.9
|Aug high C = 31.0
|Sep high C = 31.6
|Oct high C = 30.9
|Nov high C = 30.4
|Dec high C = 28.7
|year high C = 31.8

|Jan mean C = 22.7
|Feb mean C = 24.8
|Mar mean C = 28.1
|Apr mean C = 29.5
|May mean C = 29.3
|Jun mean C = 28.7
|Jul mean C = 27.6
|Aug mean C = 27.6
|Sep mean C = 27.6
|Oct mean C = 26.6
|Nov mean C = 24.0
|Dec mean C = 21.7
|year mean C = 26.5

|Jan low C = 15.1
|Feb low C = 18.3
|Mar low C = 21.7
|Apr low C = 23.9
|May low C = 24.2
|Jun low C = 25.1
|Jul low C = 24.3
|Aug low C = 24.2
|Sep low C = 23.4
|Oct low C = 21.6
|Nov low C = 19.0
|Dec low C = 15.2
|year low C = 21.3

|Jan record low C = 8.0
|Feb record low C = 10.0
|Mar record low C = 10.0
|Apr record low C = 15.0
|May record low C = 17.5
|Jun record low C = 19.0
|Jul record low C = 18.2
|Aug record low C = 18.0
|Sep record low C = 18.0
|Oct record low C = 14.0
|Nov record low C = 6.0
|Dec record low C = 3.0
|year record low C = 3.0

|precipitation colour = green
|Jan precipitation mm = 2.4
|Feb precipitation mm = 24.2
|Mar precipitation mm = 41.7
|Apr precipitation mm = 99.4
|May precipitation mm = 215.8
|Jun precipitation mm = 224.6
|Jul precipitation mm = 274.5
|Aug precipitation mm = 323.1
|Sep precipitation mm = 249.4
|Oct precipitation mm = 117.8
|Nov precipitation mm = 13.8
|Dec precipitation mm = 2.0

|unit precipitation days = 1.0 mm
|Jan precipitation days = 2.9
|Feb precipitation days = 4.6
|Mar precipitation days = 3.9
|Apr precipitation days = 8.0
|May precipitation days = 17.6
|Jun precipitation days = 17.9
|Jul precipitation days = 20.9
|Aug precipitation days = 20.7
|Sep precipitation days = 19.8
|Oct precipitation days = 11.5
|Nov precipitation days = 4.0
|Dec precipitation days = 2.3

|source 1 = Meteo Climat
}}

Sister cities
 Phnom Penh, Cambodia

References

External links

 

 
Populated places in Savannakhet Province
Laos–Thailand border crossings
Populated places on the Mekong River